Eslamabad (also Romanized as Eslāmābād) is a village in Horgan Rural District, in the Central District of Neyriz County, Fars Province, Iran. At the 2006 census, its population was 45, in 13 families.

References 

Populated places in Neyriz County